Oslo Rugbyklubb is a Norwegian rugby club based in the nation's capital, Oslo. They currently compete in the Norway Rugby Championship and are the oldest club in the country.

The club was founded in 1964.

Honours
Norway Rugby Championship
1978, 2002, 2003, 2007, 2008, 2010, 2011, 2012

Current squad

References

External links
 Oslo RK

Norwegian rugby union teams
Rugby clubs established in 1964
Sport in Oslo